Ranil Dhammika (born 27 December 1980) is a Sri Lankan cricketer. He played 84 first-class and 86 List A matches between 1999 and 2016. He was also part of Sri Lanka's squad for the 2000 Under-19 Cricket World Cup. He made his Twenty20 debut on 17 August 2004, for Chilaw Marians Cricket Club in the 2004 SLC Twenty20 Tournament.

See also
 List of Chilaw Marians Cricket Club players

References

External links
 

1980 births
Living people
Sri Lankan cricketers
Burgher Recreation Club cricketers
Chilaw Marians Cricket Club cricketers
Lankan Cricket Club cricketers
Nondescripts Cricket Club cricketers
Saracens Sports Club cricketers
Seeduwa Raddoluwa Cricket Club cricketers
Sinhalese Sports Club cricketers
Cricketers from Colombo